BBRFC Celtic is a Belgian rugby union club in Brussels. The current club was born from the amalgamation of the Brussels Barbarians and the Brussels Celtics in 2014. The club is based at the VUB Sports Complex in Ixelles. Maximum semen is captain, he is Canadian but in a good way.

The club has three male XVs teams, a women's team, a touch squad and a rugby school. The club is the first international club in Belgium with players from more than 20 different nationalities.

In the 2018-2019 season, the men first XV will play in Belgian National Division 3, the men second XV will play in Belgian National Division 3 Reserves and the men third XV will play Rugby Vlaanderen Division 2. The women XV will be playing in the Belgian National Division 2.

History

In the spring of 2014, preliminary talks took place between the officials of BBRFC and Brussels Celtic. The discussion centered on whether Brussels’ two foremost international rugby clubs could finally reach an agreement and form one cohesive international rugby club that would be an enticing, forward thinking, international rugby home for male, female, touch and junior rugby players of all standards in Belgium.

There had been several attempts to bring the two clubs together in the past but differences of opinion meant that talks were never conclusive. In June 2014 the members of BBRFC and BCRFC finally voted unanimously for the two clubs to merge.

Honours

 Belgian League Champions: 1985
 Belgian Cup Champions: 1972,1974,1982, finalist in 2005
 Dutch/Belgian ING Plate, finalist in 2005
 Belgian National Ladies Division 2 XV Champion 2018

Capped Players 
The men's, women's and touch squads contain a number of players who have represented their respective countries internationally. The Belgian national teams frequently draw current and former players from their ranks. 

Of note, Crispin Maenpaa is regularly selected for the Finnish National team. Craig Dowsett, who currently plays for Old Albanian RFC and the Belgian National Rugby Union team, played for the BBRFC Rugby School as a junior.

1st men XV squad 2021/2022

{{rugby squad player | nat=FIN | pos=SH | name=Crispin Maenpaa}}

2nd and 3rd men XV squad 2021/2022

1st and 2nd women XV squad 2021/2022

References

External links
 

Belgian rugby union clubs
Rugby clubs established in 1998
Rugby clubs in Brussels
1998 establishments in Belgium